Eugene Brown may refer to:

 Sufi Abdul Hamid (Eugene Brown, 1903–1938), African-American religious and labor leader
 Gene Brown (basketball) (1935–2020), American basketball player, and sheriff of San Francisco, 1978–1979

See also 
 Gene Brown (disambiguation)